Tony Miller  MBE, (1929–88) was an Australian rugby union footballer and coach, A state and national representative second-row forward, he played forty-one Test matches for Australia in a representative career spanning sixteen seasons. His age at 38 years, 113 days at the time of his last Wallaby appearance stands as the Australian Test record for the oldest player. His club career spanned an extraordinary twenty-three years. He is an inductee to the Australian Rugby Union Hall of Fame.

Miller was born in Manly, New South Wales). His club rugby career was played with the Manly Rugby Club in Sydney. His international debut for Australia was against Fiji in 1952. His Test appearance against Scotland on the 1966–67 Australia rugby union tour of Britain, Ireland and France marked an Australian Test cap record at that time, of thirty-seven career appearances. After his long playing career ended he coached at the Manly club for four years before commencing a long coaching association with the Warringah Rugby Club.

Published references
 Howell, Max (2005) Born to Lead - Wallaby Test Captains, Celebrity Books, Auckland NZ
 Zavos, Spiro (2000) The Golden Wallabies, Penguin, Victoria

Footnotes

1929 births
1988 deaths
Australian rugby union coaches
Australian rugby union players
Australia international rugby union players
Rugby union locks
Rugby union players from Sydney